Elizabeth Vandiver (born 1956) is an American classical scholar.  She is the Clement Biddle Penrose Professor of Latin and Classics at Whitman College, having previously taught at the University of Maryland, College Park. She received the prestigious Excellence in Teaching Award from the American Philological Association in 1998. She garnered awards for her teaching from Northwestern University and the University of Georgia. In May 2013, she was awarded Whitman College's "G. Thomas Edwards Award for Excellence in Teaching and Scholarship," the highest award that Whitman College gives to a faculty member.

Work
Vandiver did undergraduate work at Shimer College in Illinois where she enrolled as an early entrant at the age of 16, after completing tenth grade. She earned a B.A. degree in 1976, and then worked several years as a librarian. She received her Ph.D. from The University of Texas at Austin in 1990.  Her dissertation was on Herodotus and was published as Heroes in Herodotus: The Interaction of Myth and History.   In February 2010, Oxford University Press published her  study Stand in the Trench, Achilles: Classical Receptions in British Poetry of the Great War. She has taught at the University of Maryland, Northwestern University, the University of Georgia, the Intercollegiate Center for Classical Studies in Rome, Italy, Loyola University New Orleans, Louisiana, and Utah State University.

The Teaching Company
She has recorded several highly reviewed lecture series for The Teaching Company in the field of classical history and literature which include the following:
 Great Authors of the Western Literary Tradition (with other professors)
 Classical Mythology
 Odyssey of Homer
 Iliad of Homer
 Greek Tragedy
 Herodotus: The Father of History
 Aeneid of Virgil

Books
 Heroes in Herodotus: The Interaction of Myth and History. Oxford University Press, 2013.
 Luther's Lives: Two Contemporary Accounts of Martin Luther, translated and edited by Elizabeth Vandiver, Ralph Keen, and Thomas D. Frazel. Manchester University Press, 2003.
 Stand in the Trench, Achilles: Classical Receptions in British Poetry of the Great War Peter Lang, 1991.

References

External links
"Professor Elizabeth Vandiver, Ph.D." (Elizabeth Vandiver bio page at The Great Courses)
"Expanding the Bounds of Thought" (transcript of Whitman College baccalaureate address)
Whitman

American classical scholars
Women classical scholars
Living people
Whitman College faculty
Shimer College alumni
1956 births